The Shire of McIvor was a local government area about  north of Melbourne, the state capital of Victoria, Australia.

History

McIvor was incorporated as a road district on 26 June 1863, and became a shire on 23 December 1864.

The Borough of Heathcote was created around the town of Heathcote in August 1869, but was reannexed as the Central Riding on 27 May 1892. Part of the East Riding was annexed to the Shire of Goulburn on 16 May 1956.

On 18 November 1994, the Shire of McIvor was abolished, with most of its area, including Heathcote, transferring into the City of Greater Bendigo, which was created earlier in April 1994. The Graytown district was transferred into the newly created Shire of Strathbogie, while the Mia Mia and Tooborac districts were transferred into the newly created Shire of Mitchell.

Wards

The Shire of McIvor was divided into four ridings on 16 May 1956, each of which elected three councillors:
 Centre Riding
 East Riding
 North West Riding
 South West Riding

Towns and localities
 Argyle
 Costerfield
 Derrinal
 Glenhope
 Graytown
 Heathcote*
 Knowsley
 Mia Mia
 Redcastle
 Tooborac

* Council seat.

Population

* Estimate in the 1958 Victorian Year Book.

References

External links
 Victorian Places - McIvor Shire

Macivor